Akazai is a Pakhtoon (or Pashtoon; Pathan) tribe of northern Pakistan. It is a division of the Isazai clan within the Yousafzai tribe, which is regarded as one of the most powerful, famous, and respected tribes of Pashtoons. Military historian Colonel Harold Carmichael Wylly provided a personal perspective of the large Yousafzai tribe, stating, "The Yousafzai is an agriculturist, generally a fine, well-limbed man of a good physique and appearance with great deal of race-pride, well dressed and cheery, while his hospitality is proverbial".

Origin
The Akazais are considered to be a tribe among the Black Mountain (Tor Ghar) Tribes, a division of the Isazai clan of the Yousafzai tribe. They are the descendants of Aka, the son of Isa (Isazai), and the grandson of Yusaf/Yousaf/(Yousafzai). The Akazais are further divided into four sections with each section having two or more sub-sections.

Sections and sub-sections

Demographics

The majority of the Azakai tribe (approximately 35,000) occupies the western slopes of a mountainous region known as Tor Ghar (meaning "Black Mountain"). Akazais also inhabit a portion of the crest of Tor Ghar on the northern side of  Hassanzais. On their eastern side is part of Agror, to the north are Chagharzais (Nasrat Khel and Basi Khel) while to the west is the famous Indus River. The southern face of Machai Sar ("Peak"), which is the highest peak of Tor Ghar, belongs to the Akazais. The main Akazai villages are Kand (Upper and Lower), Bimbal and Bilianrey. Other villages are Darbanrey, Kanar, Bakrey, Laid, Lashora, Bakianra, Moraata, Torum, and Larey. During the period of Sikh rule and up to 1868, Akazais held the village of Shahtut in Agror valley (Oghi Tehsil). For better prospects of life, Akazais migrated to adjoining area and cities within Pakistan. People who migrated from Tor Ghar are now living in Tehsil Oghi of the Mansehra District (adjoining Tor Ghar), Malikpura - Abbottabad, Khalabat Township, Nara, Haripur, Karachi, Rawalpindi and Burhan in District Attock.

Fighting against the British
During the British Rule 1858 to 1947, Tor Ghar had never been under its administration. The Akazais, along with the Hassanzais, were very active in fighting against the British.

The fighting character and bravery of the tribe was described by Sir William Wilson Hunter as follows: 

The Indian-British government sent four major expeditions to Tor Ghar to suppress The Black Mountain (Tor Ghar) Tribes at different times:

 Expedition against Hassanzais - 1852-1853  This force consisted of 3,800 troops commanded by Lieutenant Colonel Mackeson, C.B. In this expedition, five soldiers were killed and 10 wounded.
 Expedition against Black Mountain Tribes -  1868  This force consisted of 12,544 troops commanded by Major General Wilde. In this expedition, 55 soldiers were killed and 29 wounded.
 Expedition against Black Mountain Tribes - 1888  This force consisted of 9,416 troops commanded by Major General J. McQueen. In this expedition, 25 soldiers were killed and 57 wounded.
 Expedition Against The Hasanzai And Akazai Tribes Of The Black Mountain 1891  This force consisted of 7,289 troops commanded by Major General W.K. Elles. In this expedition, 9 soldiers were killed and 39 wounded.<ref>A H Manson Expedition Against The Hasanzai And Akazai Tribes Of The Black Mountain 1891(https://archive.org/details/in.ernet.dli.2015.278708</ref>
 The Akazais provided 1,000 fighting men for the famous Ambela Operation in December 1863.

After the creation of Pakistan on 14 August 1947, Tor Ghar was given the status of Tribal Area under the administration of the provincial government of Khyber Pakhtunkhwa (North West Frontier Province).

Culture and Traditions
Like all other Pashtuns, Akazais have maintained their cultural identity. They strictly follow the code of ethics of Pashtunwali, which comprises Manliness, Goodness, Gallantry, Loyalty and Modesty. Akazais have also maintained the Pashtoon customs of Jirga (consultative assembly), Nanawati (delegation pleading guilty), Hujhra (large drawing room) and Melmasteya'' (hospitality).

Language
Pushto is the basic language of Akazais. Having less interaction with other people/languages due rugged nature terrain and less roads; the Akazais of Tor Ghar speak the purest form of Pushto. Akazais who migrated to other areas have adopted local languages like; Hindko in Hazara Division.

Recent Developments

On 28 January 2011, Tor Ghar became the 25th District of Khyber Pakhtoonkhwa.
Judba is the capital of this newly created district with following tehsils:
 Judba
 Kandar Hassanzai
 Mada Khel
Most of the Akazai areas come under the Kandar Hassanzai tehsil.

References 

Social groups of Pakistan
Yusufzai Pashtun tribes